Little Iskut is an eroded volcanic outcrop in the Tahltan Highland of northwestern British Columbia, Canada. It is associated with the central portion of the Mount Edziza volcanic complex and last erupted during the Pliocene period.

See also
List of volcanoes in Canada
List of Northern Cordilleran volcanoes
Volcanism of Canada
Volcanism of Western Canada

References

Mount Edziza volcanic complex
Pliocene shield volcanoes
Shield volcanoes of Canada